Ancil Delos Brown (September 19, 1873 – March 17, 1960) was an American football player and coach.  He served as the co-head football coach with Jason B. Parrish at Syracuse University in 1903 and as the head football coach at the University of Arkansas from 1904 to 1905, compiling a career college football record of 11–15.
Brown was born in Freetown, New York in 1873.

Brown was an alumnus of the Syracuse University and captained their 1902 football team.   He later worked as an attorney and was married to Lillian.  He died in 1960 at his home in Syracuse, New York.

Head coaching record

References

External links
 

1873 births
1960 deaths
Arkansas Razorbacks football coaches
Syracuse Orange football coaches
Syracuse Orange football players
People from Cortland County, New York
Players of American football from New York (state)